IITA can refer to

Institute of Information Technology Advancement, South Korea.
International Institute of Tropical Agriculture, Nigeria